Ephraim Markovich Sklyansky ( – August 27, 1925) was a Soviet revolutionary and statesman. He was one of the founders of the Red Army, an associate of Leon Trotsky, and a major contributor to the communist victory in the Russian Civil War. His death by drowning during a visit to the USA caused enduring speculation that he may have been murdered.

Life and career 
Ephraim Sklyansky was born into a lower middle class Jewish family in the township of Fastiv in Kiev Governorate (present-day Ukraine). In 1899, his family moved to Zhitomir. In 1911-16, he studied medicine at Kiev University, and joined the Bolsheviks as a student. After graduation, he was drafted, and served first in the infantry, and later as an army doctor, and became prominent in the clandestine military organizations of the Bolsheviks. At the time of the October Revolution, Sklyansky was a member of the Military Revolutionary Committee of the Petrograd Soviet, and was spotted by Trotsky when he took over as People's Commissar for War early in 1918. In his memoirs, Trotsky wrote:

Sklyansky was removed from his post in April 1924, and replaced by Mikhail Frunze, and made chairman of the Mossukno state textile trust. He was written out of almost every history of the civil war during the Stalin years although there is "no doubt about Sklyansky's crucial role in the conduct of military affairs."

Death by Drowning 
In May 1925, Sklyansky left on a tour of Germany, France, and the United States to acquire technical information. Both men were drowned.

Sklyansky's and Khurgin's funeral, on Broadway on 31 August, which drew a crowd of about 500, was said to be New York City's "first Soviet funeral". A large wreath sent by Trotsky was prominently displayed. The speakers included the poet Vladimir Mayakovsky, who had been staying with Khurgin in New York, and was thrown into gloom by his death. According to Mayakovsky's biographer: "He never wrote a line about Khurgin's death. He could not tell the truth and he did not want to lie."

References 

Isaac Deutscher, The Prophet Armed: Trotsky: 1879-1921

External links
biography (in Russian)

Russian revolutionaries
Ukrainian revolutionaries
Ukrainian Jews
Jewish socialists
1892 births
1925 deaths
Accidental deaths in New York (state)
Jewish Soviet politicians
Boating accident deaths
Old Bolsheviks
People of the Russian Civil War